DeMarcus Lee Sharp (born December 26, 1998) is an American college basketball player for the Northwestern State Demons of the Southland Conference. He previously played for Missouri State, Colby Community College and Moberly Area Community College.

Sharp began his college career at Moberly Area Community College, then moved to Colby Community College in Kansas for his sophomore year. At the close of his sophomore season, he was named a first-team junior college All-American.

From junior college, Sharp transferred to Missouri State. He had a strong first season for the Bears, averaging 8.2 points and 3.7 assists per game and earning a spot on the Missouri Valley Conference all-newcomer team. But his second season was marred by injury as a stress fracture limited him to only eight games. At the end of the season, Sharp opted to transfer.

After former Missouri State assistant Corey Gipson was named head coach for the Northwestern State Demons, Sharp chose to follow. He averaged 19.5 points, 5 rebounds and 5 assists for the Demons, earning Southland Player of the Year and Newcomer of the Year honors.

References

External links
Northwestern State Demons bio
Missouri State Bears bio
College stats @ sports-reference.com

1998 births
Living people
American men's basketball players
Basketball players from Missouri
Missouri State Bears basketball players
Moberly Greyhounds men's basketball players
Northwestern State Demons basketball players
People from Charleston, Missouri
People from Sikeston, Missouri
Point guards